The team jumping in equestrian at the 1948 Olympic Games in London was held at the Empire Stadium on 14 August. The competition consisted of a single round of jumping. In the case of a tie in points, a jump-off was arranged. The jump-off had no time limit, however, the time taken to complete the jump-off was used as a tie-breaker. The points from the individual competition were also used in the team competition.

Results

References

Equestrian at the Summer Olympics